Kindia (N’ko: ߞߌ߲ߘߌߦߊ߫) is the fourth largest city in Guinea, lying about 85 miles northeast of the nation's capital, Conakry. Its estimated population in 2008 was 181,126. Kindia serves as the capital and largest city of Kindia Prefecture and Kindia Region. It also forms a sub-prefecture of Guinea.

Geography 

The city is near Mount Gangan and the Mariée Falls.

History 

The city was founded in 1904 on the route of Conakry Railway in Kankan.

Economy 
Kindia grew around banana plantations after the construction of a now-closed railway to the capital.

Demography
The city of Kindia has an ethnically diverse population, although the Susu make up the majority of the population, followed by the Mandinka. The city is home to virtually all of the country's ethnic groups. After the capital Conakry, Kindia is home to the second largest Sierra Leonean community in Guinea. An estimated 9,000 Sierra Leoneans reside in the city, many of them have obtain Guinean citizenship. Like every city in Western Guinea, including the capital Conakry, the  Susu language is the most widely spoken language in Kindia and is understood by virtually the entire population.

Climate
Kindia has a tropical savanna climate (Köppen climate classification Aw).

References 

Regional capitals in Guinea
Sub-prefectures of the Kindia Region
French West Africa
Populated places established in 1904
1904 establishments in French West Africa